The Wizard is a supervillain appearing in American comic books published by DC Comics.

The Wizard was played by Joe Knezevich in the first season of the television series Stargirl for DC Universe and The CW network.

Publication history
The Wizard first appeared in All Star Comics #34 (April–May 1947) in the story titled "The Wiles of The Wizard" written by Gardner Fox with art by Irwin Hasen. In October 1947, the Wizard was one of the six original members of the Injustice Society, who began battling the Justice Society of America in All Star Comics #37 (October 1947).

Fictional character biography
Born in approximately 1913, William Asmodeus Zard grew up living a life of crime. As a gun man for various crime bosses, he ultimately ended up in jail. With the passage of time, he formulated a strategy to become a specialized kingpin. To accomplish this task, he moved to Tibet and trained under a proficient lama in the mystic arts of illusion and deception. Upon completion of his training, he proceeded to slay his master. Returning to the United States, he embarked on a career as a criminal magician. Believing that the Justice Society of America was merely a cover for a criminal organization, he first offered a reward of $1,000,000 to them in the paper under the alias W. I. Zard, later asking to join them. To prove to himself that they were not really criminals, the Wizard attempted several criminal acts which were thwarted one by one by members of the Society. Realizing his misconception, he tried to destroy them with his illusions, but was stopped by Doctor Mid-Nite's blackout bomb.

The Wizard helped to form the Injustice Society with Per Degaton, Vandal Savage, Thinker, Gambler, and Brain Wave, which engineered five jailbreaks. Each member proceeded to steal some key item from the U.S. government while leading an army of prison escapees, taking control of a portion of the American midwest, and collectively they captured their heroic counterparts, with the Wizard capturing Wonder Woman and Johnny Thunder. However, Green Lantern was able to outwit Brainwave who believed him to be dead after he fell into a ravine, though his power ring saved him at the last moment, and free the rest by impersonating the Thinker who he had captured, who was acting as a judge in the 'trial' of the JSA, where the Wizard was acting as prosecutor. The Wizard's escape was circumvented by some junior fans of the JSA.

The Wizard proceeded to escape prison once more and reformed his gang with new members Icicle, Fiddler, Sportsmaster, Huntress, and Harlequin. Each member would try and commit a 'patriotic crime', steal a historical item, and the leader would be voted for by the American people. The Harlequin, as it turned out, was actually not a criminal at heart; she merely kept up the pretense to attract the attention of Green Lantern. The JSA were captured after being knocked out by the Sportsmaster's bomb and having their memories removed. Along with aspiring Justice Society member the Black Canary, the Harlequin soon freed the heroes and restored their memories with her hypnotic glasses. However, a subliminal message had been left to restore the members to their mindless state when they heard fingers snapping, allowing the Injustice Society to recapture them when they attempted to stop the crimes. The Wizard, during the crimes, stole the Freedom Train. The JSA were placed in a chamber in which they would soon be killed. However, their memories were restored again, by the Black Canary, and they captured their foes.

In the late 1940s, the Wizard was contacted by Colonel Future to help get revenge on Earth-Two's Superman by removing him from existence and given the Glastonbury Wand, which had once belonged to Merlin and had been stolen by Future's henchmen. The Wizard accidentally eliminated only his memory of being Superman, but his Clark Kent identity remained. In 1950, Clark married Lois Lane; Lois realized he was Superman after seeing evidence of his invulnerability. Lois found the Wizard, who was now homeless and unable to perform acts of magic due to his shattered confidence at not being believed that he was responsible for Superman's disappearance. She convinced him to restore Superman's memory, after which the Wizard was happy to be sent to jail because he was now publicly known to have successfully removed Superman for a "couple of years".

The Wizard soon escaped and visited the Black Canary, exacting revenge on her for interfering with his second Injustice Society by granting the powers of a sonic scream to their baby daughter also named Dinah Lance. This girl eventually grew up to become the second Black Canary.

The Wizard proceeded to form a new villainous organization known as the Crime Champions, which teamed up with their counterparts on Earth-1 to battle the Society and Justice League of America. The villains used a vibration device accidentally discovered by the Fiddler to escape to the other Earth after committing robberies. The Wizard escaped Green Lantern and Black Canary during a million-dollar robbery. He disguised himself as Doctor Alchemy using his magic and the rest of the Earth-2 criminals disguised themselves as the Earth-1 Crime Champions. He battled Superman and Green Arrow, and helped trap the J.L.A. in their headquarters with magic. On Earth-1 he battled Hawkman and Black Canary and was beaten again, before being finally defeated by Aquaman, Wonder Woman, and the Earth-2 Flash. Years later, he again reformed the Injustice Society which were temporarily victorious, enlisting the aid of extra-dimensional writer Cary Bates in killing several members of the J.S.A prior to their being revived.

By the 1970s, Zard and the other Injustice Society members invaded the Justice Society headquarters, severely injured Hourman and staged a crime spree that spanned the globe. They were later apprehended.

Soon, he and the Injustice Society members went to Earth-1 to recruit younger villains to fight the Justice Society. The Wizard went there with the Fiddler, but once on Earth-1 he unexpectedly found that his sorcerer's powers began to weaken. Apparently, the travel from Earth-2 to Earth-1 caused the effect; the reverse happened with the Phantom Lady, who gained intangibility power when she traveled from Earth-X to Earth-1.

On Earth-1, the Wizard was recruited into Darkseid's Secret Society of Super Villains, which he later took over with other villains who revolted. The Wizard was later apprehended and sent to jail, where his powers largely faded. After escaping from prison, the Wizard reformed the Secret Society and tricked them into obtaining four magical relics: the Cloak of Invisibility, the Power Glove, the Power Stone, and the Dragon Box. Unable to control the Dragon Box, the members of the Society were captured, but the Wizard incorporated the remaining three items into his new costume. The Wizard led the Secret Society back to Earth-2 in a plot to capture the JSA, which was a success when they captured the Atom, Doctor Mid-Nite, and Mr. Terrific. The JSA were alerted and defeated them.

The Wizard was responsible for a coup in which his Secret Society, consisting of himself, Professor Zoom the Reverse-Flash, the Floronic Man, the Blockbuster, and Star Sapphire, switched bodies with members of the JLA. This happened in Justice League of America #166–168, a storyline that was revisited in Identity Crisis (2004), where it was revealed that Zatanna wiped the heroes' secret identities from the villains' minds following their defeat.

The Wizard later returned to Earth-2, once again reassembling the Crime Champions with the help of Johnny Thunder of Earth-1, but was once more defeated by the combined might of the JSA and JLA. He later appeared briefly during the JSA's trial before congress for allegations of misconduct during World War II, but was quickly defeated by Doctor Fate.

Sometime later, he moved to Canada and joined with the Fiddler and the Shade as well as new villains the Icicle II, Artemis Crock (later called the Tigress), the Harlequin III, and Hazard, to form the group Injustice Unlimited, the second incarnation of the Injustice Society, where they fought Infinity, Inc. and the Global Guardians. The Wizard was presumably killed by the second generation Hourman, Zard still had the trick of faking his death.

Of course, this too was an illusion, and he had transported himself to the land of Faeries where he could recoup his power base. Once more, he was defeated by an assemblage of heroes and by his own ego.

The Wizard appeared in the JSA All-Stars miniseries in which he disguised himself as the villain Legacy and captured the elder members of the Justice Society. He was then "killed" by the Spectre.

Shortly after Identity Crisis, Despero gave the surviving Secret Society members their memories back. In the JLA story, "Crisis of Conscience", the Wizard appeared as part of a reformed Secret Society of Super Villains looking to avenge themselves against the forced erasure of their memories. Aided by Felix Faust, they attacked the Daily Planet, and were stopped once again by the Justice League. After defeating Despero at Wayne Manor, the League was disbanded and Zatanna re-wiped the memories of all six Society members.

He has since appeared in JSA: Classified as part of a new Injustice Society that includes the Icicle, the Tigress, Solomon Grundy, the Gentleman Ghost, the Rag Doll, and Johnny Sorrow and gained possession of the key to the Ghost Zone.

During the Infinite Crisis, the Wizard was again seen in the Secret Society of Super Villains.

He showed up again fighting under the command of Johnny Sorrow as part of the Injustice Society.

In the DC Universe following the end of the "DC Rebirth" brand, Wizard was seen as a member of the Injustice Society when Hawkman and Hawkgirl recount their time in the 1940s when the Justice Society fought the Injustice Society. Wizard faced off against Green Lantern and was defeated by him.

Powers and abilities
The Wizard originally only knew the secrets of illusion, hypnosis and astral projection. In later times, he is a skilled magic user capable of performing various effects. Maybe his highest power degree was when he possessed the Wand of Glastonbury. He came into possession of the key to the Ghost Zone allowing him access to another dimension and teleportation through it.

Other characters named Wizard
There are different characters who are called Wizard:

 The wizard Shazam has often been referred to as the "Wizard" by Captain Marvel and the Marvel Family.
 The Wizard is an electricity-manipulating supervillain who faced off against Bulletman.
 Vincent Watson is a criminal who faced off against Robotman.
 Alec Royer is a villain who used stage magic to make airplanes disappear, royal jewels float away, and alien monsters appear on the streets. His activities attracted the attention of the Blackhawks who managed to draw him out and defeat him.
 Horace Kates escaped prison with Aquaman foe "Shark" Norton, and the two resolved to switch M.O.s to avoid their respective enemies. However, Aquaman captured Norton even on land, while Green Arrow and Speedy, using pneumatic-air crossbows and oxygen tanks, defeated the Wizard and his hirelings in an underwater battle.
 A different Wizard was the hero form of Robby Reed. Robby divided himself into a superhero called Wizard and a supervillain called Master to turn off the Dead Man's Switch and defeat a supervillain called Shirkon. Though Master thought he had killed his good half, Wizard actually survived and created the H-Dials that Chris King and Vicki Grant use. In the final battle with Master, Wizard appeared and managed to merge with Master changing them back into Robby Reed.

In other media

Television
 A character based on Wizard named Sir Swami appears in the Justice League episode "Legends", voiced by Jeffrey Jones. He is a member of the Injustice Guild.
 Wizard appears in Young Justice, voiced by Corey Burton.
 A variation of Wizard named William Zarick appears in the live-action DC Universe series Stargirl, portrayed by Joe Knezevich. This version is a member of the Injustice Society of America (ISA). Ten years prior to the series, Wizard partook in the ISA's attack on the Justice Society of America (JSA)'s headquarters, during which he defeated Hourman and claimed Eclipso's Black Diamond. In his civilian identity, Zarick works as a Blue Valley councilman, an executive and financial supporter of a prominent business called The American Dream, which is run by other former members of the ISA, and is the father of aspiring magician Joey Zarick (portrayed by Will Deusner) and the husband of Denise Zarick (portrayed by Cynthia Evans). Having grown weary of his obligations to the ISA and wanting a normal life with his family, William rebuffs his former leader Icicle when he comes to seek help against Stargirl amidst her attempts to revive the JSA. After Joey is killed in an accident that Icicle caused, William confronts him to avenge his son, but is frozen to death. When the media reports that William died of a heart attack and Icicle uses his company to name a theater in William's honor, Denise becomes suspicious and realizes that her husband and son were murdered by members of Blue Valley's elite. She tries to leave after warning Pat Dugan, but later discovers her car's remains in a junkyard. In the two-part season one finale "Stars and S.T.R.I.P.E.", Cindy Burman finds the Black Diamond in William's storage unit. In season two, episode "Summer School: Chapter Eleven", Zarick appears in a cameo, along with his wife and son as illusions in a black-and-white Blue Valley of Shadowlands.

Film
An unrelated character called "The Wizard" appears in the 1949 Batman and Robin movie serial, portrayed by Leonard Penn. This Wizard is a mad scientist and masked mystery villain who is later revealed to be Carter Hammill.

References

External links
 Wizard at DC Wiki

Characters created by Gardner Fox
Comics characters introduced in 1947
DC Comics characters who can teleport
DC Comics supervillains
DC Comics male supervillains
Golden Age supervillains
Earth-Two
DC Comics characters who use magic
Fictional illusionists
Fictional people from the 20th-century